Cryptocellus is an arachnid genus in the order Ricinulei, first described by John Westwood in 1874. It is native to the Neotropics.

Species 
 it contains forty-five species:
 Cryptocellus abaporu Bonaldo & Pinto-da-Rocha, 2003 — Brazil
 Cryptocellus adisi Platnick, 1988 — Brazil
 Cryptocellus albosquamatus Cooke, 1967 — Guyana
 Cryptocellus becki Platnick & Shadab, 1977 — Brazil
 Cryptocellus bocas Platnick & Shadab, 1981 — Panama
 Cryptocellus bordoni (Dumitresco & Juvara-balş, 1977) — Venezuela
 Cryptocellus brignolii Cokendolpher, 2000 — Suriname
 Cryptocellus canga Pinto-da-Rocha & Andrade, 2012 — Brazil
 Cryptocellus canutama Botero-Trujillo, Carvalho, Florez D. & Prendini, 2021 — Brazil
 Cryptocellus centralis Fage, 1921 — Costa Rica
 Cryptocellus chimaera Botero-Trujillo & Valdez-Mondragón, 2016 — Ecuador
 Cryptocellus chiriqui Platnick & Shadab, 1981 — Costa Rica, Panama
 Cryptocellus chiruisla Botero-Trujillo & Flórez D., 2017 — Ecuador
 Cryptocellus conori Tourinho & Saturnino, 2010 — Brazil
 Cryptocellus fagei Cooke & Shadab, 1973 — Costa Rica
 Cryptocellus florezi Platnick & García, 2008 — Colombia
 Cryptocellus foedus Westwood, 1874 — Brazil
 Cryptocellus gamboa Platnick & Shadab, 1981 — Panama
 Cryptocellus glenoides Cooke & Shadab, 1973 — Colombia
 Cryptocellus goodnighti Platnick & Shadab, 1981 — Costa Rica
 Cryptocellus guaviarensis Botero-Trujillo & Flórez D., 2018 — Colombia
 Cryptocellus hanseni Cooke & Shadab, 1973 — Honduras, Nicaragua
 Cryptocellus iaci Tourinho, Man-Hung & Bonaldo, 2010 — Brazil
 Cryptocellus icamiabas Tourinho & de Azevedo, 2007 — Brazil
 Cryptocellus islacolon Botero-Trujillo, Carvalho, Florez D. & Prendini, 2021 — Panama
 Cryptocellus isthmius Cooke & Shadab, 1973 — Panama
 Cryptocellus jamari Botero-Trujillo, Carvalho, Florez D. & Prendini, 2021 — Brazil
 Cryptocellus lampeli Cooke, 1967 — Guyana
 Cryptocellus leleupi Cooreman, 1976 — Ecuador
 Cryptocellus lisbethae González-Sponga, 1998 — Venezuela
 Cryptocellus luisedieri Botero-Trujillo & Pérez, 2009 — Colombia
 Cryptocellus macagual Botero-Trujillo, Carvalho, Florez D. & Prendini, 2021 — Colombia
 Cryptocellus magnus Ewing, 1929 — Colombia
 Cryptocellus muiraquitan Tourinho, Lo-Man-Hung & Salvatierra, 2014 — Brazil
 Cryptocellus narino Platnick & Paz, 1979 — Colombia
 Cryptocellus osa Platnick & Shadab, 1981 — Costa Rica
 Cryptocellus peckorum Platnick & Shadab, 1977 — Colombia
 Cryptocellus platnicki Botero-Trujillo & Pérez, 2008 — Colombia
 Cryptocellus pseudocellatus Roewer, 1952 — Peru
 Cryptocellus simonis Hansen & Sørensen, 1904 — Brazil
 Cryptocellus sofiae Botero-Trujillo, 2014 — Colombia
 Cryptocellus striatipes Cooke & Shadab, 1973 — Costa Rica
 Cryptocellus tarsilae Pinto-da-Rocha & Bonaldo, 2007 — Brazil
 Cryptocellus verde Platnick & Shadab, 1981 — Costa Rica
 Cryptocellus whitticki Platnick & Shadab, 1977 — Guyana

References

External links
 

Arachnid genera
Ricinulei
Arthropods of Central America
Taxa named by John O. Westwood